South Carolina Highway 420 (SC 420) is a  state highway in the U.S. state of South Carolina. The highway connects Shoals Junction and Ware Shoals.

Route description
SC 420 begins at an intersection with U.S. Route 178 (US 178; Mock Orange Road) in Shoals Junction, within Greenwood County where the roadway continues as Old Shoals Junction Road. It travels in a fairly northeasterly direction and crosses Dunns Creek before it enters Ware Shoals. It crosses over Turkey Creek just before meeting its eastern terminus, an intersection with US 25 Business and SC 252 Truck (South Greenwood Avenue). Here, the roadway continues as Honea Path Street.

Major intersections

See also

References

External links

SC 420 at Virginia Highways' South Carolina Highways Annex

420
Transportation in Greenwood County, South Carolina